William Henry Bates (13 January 1922 — August 1997) was an English footballer who played as a winger.

Career
Bates began his career playing for local clubs Eaton Bray and Waterlows, before signing for Luton Town. Bates made one first team appearance for Luton, playing in a 2–0 defeat against Millwall on 7 October 1946. After a spell at Chelmsford City, Bates joined Watford in time for the 1948–49 Football League season, making 13 league appearances, scoring once. Following his departure from Watford, Bates signed for Dunstable Town.

References

1922 births
1997 deaths
People from Central Bedfordshire District
Association football wingers
English footballers
Luton Town F.C. players
Chelmsford City F.C. players
Watford F.C. players
Dunstable Town F.C. players
English Football League players
Footballers from Bedfordshire